Gudgeon is the common name for a number of small freshwater fish of the families  Butidae, Cyprinidae, Eleotridae or Ptereleotridae. Most gudgeons are elongate, bottom-dwelling fish, many of which live in rapids and other fast moving water.

Families
 Cyprinidae – Various cyprinid gudgeons, members of the subfamily Gobioninae (e.g. genera Gobio, Romanogobio), are found in lakes and rivers throughout Europe. Most commonly gudgeon refers to the species Gobio gobio. This is a rheophilic and schooling species that occurs both in river and lake habitats across continental Europe and the United Kingdom. G. gobio feeds on a variety of invertebrates. This gudgeon is an easy fish to catch for beginners. A British rod caught a record 5 ounce gudgeon in 1990 on the River Nadder, Wiltshire.
 Eleotridae – Known commonly as gudgeons, many species in the family Eleotridae are also called sleeper gobies. Unlike gobies, Eleotridae gudgeons have paired ventral fins rather than a fused ventral fin. In Australia, gudgeons from the family Eleotridae are widespread and are popular for  aquariums.
 Ptereleotridae – Gudgeons in the family Ptereleotridae are primarily marine species and are often associated with tropical coral reefs.

Gallery

References

Cyprinidae
Eleotridae
Ptereleotridae
Fish common names